Podolimirus is an extinct monotypic genus of unclassified proarticulates. It presents a single species, Podolimirus mirus. It was found in strata of the late Ediacaran, at the beginning of the Cambrian. It is one of the last proarticulates. The first fossils of this genus and species were found in the Ukraine along the Dneister River close by to the deposits in the Vendian Sequence in 1983.

Discovery

The first fossil specimens of P. mirus were found and described in the Dniester River of Ukraine, near the deposits in the Vendian Sequence by Mikhail A Fedokin in the year of 1983.

See also

 list of Ediacaran genera

 Proarticulata

References

Proarticulata
Ediacaran life
Prehistoric bilaterian genera
Ediacaran
Enigmatic prehistoric animal genera
Aquatic animals